Touche is a French surname, related to Touchet and Touchette.

People with the surname
 Christian Latouche (born 1939/1940), French billionaire businessman
 Claude Guimond de La Touche (1723–1760) French playwright and poet
 David La Touche (1729–1817), MP for Newcastle (Parliament of Ireland constituency)
 David La Touche (1768–1816), MP for Newcastle (Parliament of Ireland constituency)
 Gaston La Touche (1854–1913), French post-impressionist painter
 George Touche (1861–1935), founder of Touche accountancy firm
 Sir Gordon Touche, 1st Baronet (1895–1972), British MP
 Henri de Latouche (1785–1851), French writer
 Jacques-Ignace de La Touche, French painter of miniatures and portraits
 John La Touche (disambiguation)
 Méhée de La Touche (1762–1826), French spy
 Peter La Touche (c. 1775–1830), Irish politician
 Robert La Touche, MP for Harristown (Parliament of Ireland constituency)
 Rose La Touche (1848–1875), inspiration of John Ruskin's Sesame and Lilies
 Serge Latouche (born 1940), French economist
 Touche baronets, related to above-mentioned George and Gordon

Middle or double surname
 Anthony La Touche Kirwan (fl. 1839–1868), Irish Anglican priest
 Charles-Auguste Levassor de La Touche-Tréville (1745–1788), French naval officer
 Edmund la Touche Armstrong (1864–1946), Australian historian and librarian
 Jeremiah La Touche Cuyler (1768–1839), United States federal judge
 Louis-René Levassor de Latouche Tréville (1745–1804), French naval officer
 William La Touche Congreve (1891–1916), English soldier
 Valentine la Touche McEntee, 1st Baron McEntee (1871–1953), Irish-born UK politician

See also
 Touche (disambiguation)

References

Surnames of French origin